Gabriele Morelli (born 12 December 1996) is an Italian footballer who plays as a defender for  club Gubbio.

Career
On 28 January 2021, he joined Südtirol on loan until the end of the 2020–21 season.

On 4 August 2021, he signed a two-year contract with ACR Messina.

On 4 August 2022, Morelli moved to Gubbio on a two-year contract.

Honours
Livorno
Serie C: 2017–18 (Group A)

References

External links
Gabriele Morelli profile at LivornoCalcio.it

1996 births
Living people
Sportspeople from Livorno
Footballers from Tuscany
Italian footballers
Association football defenders
Serie B players
Serie C players
U.S. Livorno 1915 players
Juventus Next Gen players
F.C. Südtirol players
A.C.R. Messina players
A.S. Gubbio 1910 players